Jacob Johnson (April 17, 1778 – January 4, 1812) was the father of Andrew Johnson, the 17th president of the United States.

Early life
Jacob Johnson was born on April 17, 1778. The circumstances and location of his birth remain in dispute among scholars.

Marriage and family
Jacob Johnson married Mary "Polly" McDonough (July 17, 1783 – February 13, 1856) on September 9, 1801, in Wake County, North Carolina. They had three children: William Patterson Johnson (1804–1865), Elizabeth Johnson (born 1806), and Andrew Johnson (December 29, 1808 – July 31, 1875).

Career
Known as "mud-sills" (lower-class people), Jacob and Mary Johnson were both employed at Casso's Inn, where Mary worked as a weaver and clothes washer, and Jacob was a hostler. Jacob also was a militia Captain of Muster Division 20, a sexton for the Presbyterian Church, and a porter for the State Bank of North Carolina (chartered in 1811). Jacob Johnson is also said to have been the sole bell toller in Raleigh.

Home
 The Johnson family home was an out-building of Casso's Inn, a popular antebellum inn northeast of the present-day North Carolina State Capitol building. Casso's Inn was owned by Peter Casso, a Revolutionary War soldier. The out-building is of two rooms, one on the main floor and one in the garret of the Dutch or gambrel roof.  The Johnson home is now preserved at Mordecai Historic Park in Raleigh, North Carolina.

Death
Jacob Johnson saved the lives of Colonel Thomas Henderson, the young editor of the Raleigh Star, and his friend Mr. Callum, when the enthusiastic group of fishermen capsized their fishing skiff on Walnut Creek near Hunter's Mill in December 1811. The third occupant of the skiff, Mr. William Peace, had no trouble getting to shore. Johnson jumped in the water and saved Henderson and Callum, to the detriment of his own health. He died several weeks later, ironically, while ringing the funeral bell at the State Capitol Building. He was buried at the Old City Cemetery in Raleigh, North Carolina.

Johnson's obituary from the Raleigh Star of January 10, 1812, read:
"Died, in this city, on Saturday last, Jacob Johnson, who had for years occupied a humble but useful station in Society. He was a city constable, sexton, and porter of the State Bank. In his last illness he was visited by the principal inhabitants of the city, by all whom he was esteemed for his honesty, industry, and humane and friendly disposition. Among all whom he was known and esteemed none lament him more (except, perhaps, his relatives) than the publisher of this paper; for he owes his life, on a particular occasion, to the boldness and humanity of Johnson."

Following his death, Mary (McDonough) Johnson married Turner Daughtrey (or Daugherty) on May 6, 1812, in Wake County, North Carolina. She is buried in the Andrew Johnson National Cemetery, Greenville, Greene County, Tennessee after her death in 1856.

Dedication of grave
 Jacob's grave remained marked only by "J.X.J." until 1867, when the current marker was erected. The writing on the marker has been obliterated from weather and vandalism, but an early account indicates that it was inscribed as follows:
"In memory of Jacob Johnson. An honest man, loved and respected by all who knew him."

Then-president Andrew Johnson was invited by Raleigh Mayor William Dallas Haywood to attend the public erection of Jacob's monument. He agreed to attend the dedication; this marked Johnson's only trip to the south during his term as President. He departed Washington, DC on June 1, 1867, stayed at Richmond, Virginia on the 2nd, and arrived in Raleigh on the 3rd. Johnson stayed at the Yarborough House Hotel on Fayetteville Street during his stay, and delivered a lengthy speech about various topics shortly after arriving.  The gravesite dedication took place on June 4. At the ceremony, the president called his father an "honest and faithful friend, a character I prize higher than all the worldly fortunes that could have been left me." He spent the 5th and 6th in Chapel Hill, where he attended one of the commencement ceremonies for the University of North Carolina, and left for Washington on the 7th.

Citations

References
Websites:
State Library of North Carolina Encyclopedia Entry for Andrew Johnson: 
Legacy Family Tree entry for Jacob Johnson: 
Andrew Johnson’s father, a hero in his own right

Books:
Bergeron, Paul H. et al. The Papers of Andrew Johnson, Volume 12, February - August 1867. Knoxville: The University of Tennessee Press.  1995.
Savage, John. The Life and Public Services of Andrew Johnson, Seventeenth President of the United States. New York: Derby & Miller, Publishers. 1866.
Stryker, Lloyd Paul. Andrew Johnson: A Study in Courage. New York: The MacMillan Company. 1936.
Thomas, Lately. The First President Johnson: The Three Lives of the Seventeenth President of the United States of America. New York: William Morrow & Company, Inc. 1968.
Winston, Robert W. Andrew Johnson: Plebeian and Patriot. New York: Henry Holt and Company. 1928.

Journals:
Graf, LeRoy and Ralph W. Haskins, Editors. "This Clangor of Belated Mourning". The South Atlantic Quarterly. Volume 62.3, 1963.

1778 births
1812 deaths
Andrew Johnson family
Fathers of presidents of the United States
Fathers of vice presidents of the United States
People from Raleigh, North Carolina
Burials at City Cemetery (Raleigh, North Carolina)